Askot Musk Deer Sanctuary is located  from Pithoragarh near Askot in Uttarakhand state of India. This sanctuary has been set up primarily with the object of conserving the musk deer (Moschus leucogaster) and its habitat. Intensive efforts have been initiated to conserve this rare species. Other mammals found in this sanctuary include the Bengal tiger, Indian leopard, Himalayan jungle cat, civet, barking deer, serow, goral and Himalayan brown bear. Many species of high altitude birds are also found in this sanctuary.

Geography
It lies between 29°46'45" to 30°27'45"N latitude and 81°01'53" to 80°16'25"E longitude and covers almost . The River Kali forms the international boundary and separates it from Nepal in the east and to the west it is bounded by West Almora Forest Division, to the north by Tibet and the south by Pithoragarh Forest Division.

The famous peaks: Panchchuli, Neodhura, Naukana, Chhiplakot, Najirikot; the passes: Lipu lekh, Lumpiya lekh and Mankshang lekh: and the religious places: Bhanar, Chiplakot, Niirikot, Panchachuli, Kalapani and Chota Kailash (Adi Kailash) form a part of the Sanctuary. The Dhauli and Ikli rivers originate from the area and Gori Ganga passes through it. The forest blocks: Rugling, Jyotigad, Hiragumarhi, Duk, Sobla, East Ghandhura, West Ghandhura, Maitham, Akla and Daphia are biodiversity rich habitats of the Sanctuary.

References

External links
 Askot Musk Deer Sanctuary Official site 

Wildlife sanctuaries in Uttarakhand
Geography of Pithoragarh district
Musk deer
Western Himalayan broadleaf forests
Important Bird Areas of India
Protected areas established in 1986
1986 establishments in Uttar Pradesh